The Moldova national under-17 football team represents Moldova in international football at this age level and is controlled by the Moldovan Football Federation, the governing body for football in Moldova. The team competes to qualify for the UEFA European Under-17 Championship held every year. They qualified for the 2002 competition but finished last in the group stage. It is considered a feeder team of the Moldova under-19 and under-21 teams. Players born on or after 1 January 2007 are eligible for the 2024 UEFA European Under-17 Championship qualification. They are currently coached by Adrian Sosnovschi.

Competition history

UEFA U-16/17 European Championship
Under-16 era, 1995–2001Under-17 era, 2002– present

2024 UEFA European Under-17 Championship

Qualifying round

2023 UEFA European Under-17 Championship

Qualifying round

All-time record
Only competitive matches are included.

See also
 Moldova national football team
 Moldova national under-21 football team
 Moldova national under-19 football team

References

External links
 Moldova U-17 at uefa.com
 Moldova U-17 at soccerway

 

Moldova national football team
European national under-17 association football teams